Voin may refer to:
Voin, alternative name of Vainius (fl. 1315–1338/1342), Prince of Polotsk
Voin Rimsky-Korsakov (1822–1871), Russian navigator and geographer
Voin (rural locality), a rural locality (a selo) in Namsky District of the Sakha Republic, Russia